This is a list of equestrian statues in Italy.

Frequently represented persons:
Giuseppe Garibaldi (1807–1882)
Victor Emmanuel II (1820–1878), Italian: Vittorio Emanuele II

Rome 
Equestrian Statue of Marcus Aurelius, 5 m. tall, Roman bronze equestrian in the Capitoline Museums, previously on Piazza del Campidoglio, second half of the 2nd century.
Replica of the Equestrian Statue of Marcus Aurelius, at Piazza del Campidoglio
Equestrian statue of Victor Emmanuel II of Italy, 12 m tall, on the Monument to Vittorio Emanuele II, between the Piazza Venezia and the Capitoline Hill
Equestrian of Umberto I, at Villa Borghese
Equestrian of Giuseppe Garibaldi by Emilio Gallori at the Piazza Garibaldi, 1895.
Equestrian of Anita Garibaldi by Mario Rutelli located 200m north of the Piazza Garibaldi alongside the Viale aldo Fabrizi, 1932.
Equestrian of Skanderbeg, at Piazza Albania
Equestrian of King Carlo Alberto in the center of the Quirinale Gardens
Equestrian of Emperor Constantine I by Bernini, north end of the narthex in St. Peter's Basilica, Vatican City, 1670.
Equestrian of Charlemagne by Cornacchini, south end of the narthex in St. Peter's Basilica, Vatican City, 18th century.

Assisi 
Equestrian statue of Francis of Assisi, in the Upper Courtyard of the Basilica of San Francesco d'Assisi

Asti 
Umberto I by Odoardo Tabacchi, at Piazza Cairoli

Bergamo 
Monument on the Bartolomeo Colleoni's tomb in Cappella Colleoni. Aureate wood by Leonardo Siry and Sisto da Norimberga.

Bologna 
Equestrian of Giuseppe Garibaldi in the Via Indipendenza.
Equestrian of Benito Mussolini by Giuseppe Graziosi at Stadio Renato Dall'Ara (no longer existent)

Brescia 
Equestrian of Giuseppe Garibaldi by Eugenio Maccagnani at the Piazza Garibaldi, 1889.

Casale Monferrato 
Carlo Alberto on Piazza Giuseppe Mazzini

Ferrara 
Monument to Niccolò III d'Este by Giacomo Zilocchi at piazza della Cattedrale, 1927.

Fiesole 
L'incontro di Teano by Oreste Calzolari, equestrian statues of Vittorio Emanuele II and Giuseppe Garibaldi at Piazza Mino, 1906

Florence 
Giambologna's and Pietro Tacca's Equestrian Monument of Ferdinando I (1608) on the Piazza della Santissima Annunziata.
Cosimo I de' Medici by Giambologna (1598) on the Piazza della Signoria.
Equestrian of Victor Emmanuel II at the Parco delle Cascine.

Genova 
Equestrian of Giuseppe Garibaldi by Augusto Rivalta at the Piazza De Ferrari, 1879.
Equestrian of Victor Emmanuel II at the Piazza Corvetto.

La Spezia 
Equestrian monument to Giuseppe Garibaldi by Antonio Garella, 1913.

Livorno 
Equestrian of Victor Emmanuel II by Augusto Rivalta.

Lodi 
Monument to Frederick I Barbarossa by Felice Vanelli, 2008

Milan 
Monument to Bernabò Visconti by Bonino da Campione, originally in San Giovanni in Conca, now in the Museo di arte antica, Castello Sforzesco, 1363.
Equestrian monument to Victor Emmanuel II by Ercole Rosa at the Piazza del Duomo, 1896.
Equestrian of Giuseppe Garibaldi by Ettore Ximenes at the Piazzale Carioli ("Piazza Castello"), 1895.
Equestrian of General General Giuseppe Missori by Riccardo Ripamonti at the Piazza Missori, 1916.
Clay model of the horse for equestrian statue to Francesco I Sforza was completed by Leonardo da Vinci in Milan 1492; cast as an equine statue and placed in Milan outside the racetrack of Ippodromo del Galoppo in 1992.

Naples 
Equestrian of Victor Emmanuel II at the Piazza Municipio.
Equestrian of King Carlo III di Borbone (Carlo III) at the Piazza del Plebiscito.
Equestrian of King Ferdinando I delle Due Sicilie at the Piazza del Plebiscito.
Equestrian of General Armando Diaz in the via Caracciolo.
Equestrian of Marcus Nonius Balbus, in the Naples National Archaeological Museum

Padua 
Donatello's Gattamelata (1453) on the piazza in front of the Basilica of Saint Anthony. It was the first full-size equestrian bronze cast since antiquity.

Perugia 
Equestrian of Victor Emmanuel II.

Piacenza 
Francesco Mochi's monument to Ranuccio II Farnese (1620) at the Piazza dei Cavalli (Horses' Square).
Francesco Mochi's monument to Alessandro Farnese (1629) at the Piazza dei Cavalli (Horses' Square).

Pistoia
Equestrian statue of Giuseppe Garibaldi

Ponte Gardena
Al Genio del Fascismo by G. Gori, renamed Al Genio del Lavoratore Italiano in 1945, 1938 (destroyed in 1961).

Rovigo 
Equestrian monument to Giuseppe Garibaldi by Ettore Ferrari, at Piazza Giuseppe Garibaldi

Savona 
Equestrian monument to Giuseppe Garibaldi by Leonardo Bistolfi, 1912-1928

Turin 
Equestrian  of Duke Emanuele Filiberto, at Piazza San Carlo
Two equestrian statues of the Dioscuri (Castor and Pollux), by Abbondio Sangiorgio, at the Palazzo Reale
Equestrian  of King Carlo Alberto by Carlo Marocchetti, at Piazza Carlo Alberto
Equestrian statue of Alfonso La Marmora, at Piazza Bodoni

Venice 
Bartolomeo Colleoni by Verrocchio on the Campo dei santi Giovanni e Paolo square.
Equestrian of Victor Emmanuel II by Ettore Ferrari on the Riva degli Schiavoni, 1887.
Golden statue on the tomb Domenico Contarini (died 1526), in Santo Stefano church, 1650.

Verona 
Equestrian statues from the Scaliger Tombs, now at the Castelvecchio Museum:
Cangrande I della Scala
Mastino II della Scala
Equestrian of Cangrande I della Scala, copy at the Scaliger Tombs 
Equestrian of Cansignorio della Scala
Equestrian of Victor Emmanuel II at the Piazza Bra
Monument to Giuseppe Garibaldi by Pietro Bordini, at Piazza Indipendenza, 1887

References

Italy

Equestrian statues